Jack Hart-Davis (1900 – 25 April 1963) was a South African cricket umpire. He stood in four Test matches between 1948 and 1950.

See also
 List of Test cricket umpires

References

1900 births
1963 deaths
Alumni of Hilton College (South Africa)
Place of birth missing
South African Test cricket umpires